Wilhelmina International Inc. (NASDAQ: WHLM), formerly Wilhelmina Models, is a full service modeling and talent agency headquartered in New York City, United States. The company also has offices in Los Angeles, Chicago and Miami. Founded in 1967 by Wilhelmina Cooper, it provides full-service representation and management to models, entertainers, artists, musicians, and athletes. In 2009 the company became the first and only publicly traded modeling and talent agency after its acquisition by New Century Equity Holdings Corp.

History
Wilhelmina International Inc. was founded in 1967 by Dutch-American model Wilhelmina Cooper and husband Victor Bruce Cooper, as well as minority partners Bill Weinberg and Fran Rothchild.  the company is one of the oldest and largest full-service model management companies in the world.
 
After Wilhelmina Cooper died in 1980 at age 40, the agency was transferred to her business partners, and was then bought in 1989 for around 4 million dollars by Horst-Dieter Esch, a German businessman with interests in the construction industry. Esch held discussions with Elite Model Management and Ford Models with a view to creating a large conglomerate agency that would be taken public, but this did not happen. The company was incorporated in Delaware in 1996.
 
In 1998, Wilhelmina partnered with Atlantic Records and created an Artist Division that matched music artists with international brands. In January 2015, the firm opened an office in London and 2016 in Chicago.  Also in 2016, Wilhelmina launched Aperture, a talent and commercial agency that represents models and actors for film, commercials, and television with offices in New York City and Los Angeles.

In February 2009, New Century Equity Holdings Corp, a publicly traded company, acquired Wilhelmina Models. Esch sold his stake in the agency for 22 million dollars. New Century subsequently changed its name to Wilhelmina International, Inc. trading under the ticker symbol 'WHLM'. The company licenses its brand to third-party agencies in countries around the world, including the United States and Dubai.
 
As of 2010 Wilhelmina represents and manages 2,100 models, celebrities, artists, athletes and content creators worldwide, including Nicki Minaj, Niall Horan, Normani, Demi Lovato, Nick Jonas, Machine Gun Kelly, 5 Seconds of Summer, Alexandra Waterbury, James B. Whiteside, Nadia Ferreira, Leona Lewis, Shawn Mendes, Dustin Lance Black, Francisco Lachowski, Barbie Ferreira, Robyn Lawley, Sora Choi, Rola Ghorab, Anne de Paula, Billie Eilish, and others.

After trading OTC, Wilhelmina entered the NASDAQ Capital Market in September 2014.

In 2016, Wilhelmina spent $2.7 million on a stock buyback, funded by a 4.5-year term loan from Amegy Bank. The company modified the loan terms and bought another $1 million of stock (150,000 shares) in 2018. At the end of 2019 the balance on the loans was $2 million. From 2012 until the end of 2019 the company repurchased over 1.3 million shares.

Bill Wackermann was hired as CEO in 2016, after being fired from Conde Nast.

In mid-2019 five employees left the women's division for Supreme, an Elite Model Management company. Wilhelmina sued the five women's division employees over non-compete clauses, which was dismissed by the judge. After the "court drama" Wackermann's "number two", VP Taylor Hendrich, and four other employees left the men's division and joined The Society Management, also part of Elite, though this was initially denied by Wackermann.

Linked to these departures, in October 2019, Bill Wackermann's employment contract was not renewed for its two-year term. He resigned as CEO in January 2020 and was replaced by majority shareholder Mark Schwarz, who had been CEO from 2007–2012 and is also known as hard rock drummer Mark Edwards from the bands Steeler and Lion.

At the end of 2019, the company had 114 employees, with 70 of those in New York City and two at the corporate headquarters in Dallas. The Dallas office is shared with Newcastle Partners, the company's largest shareholder: Schwarz's Newcastle and Schwarz entities own 47% of the stock. Total revenue in 2019 was $75.4 million, down from $77.9 million in 2018. The company posted a loss of $4.8 million in 2019, compared to a $0.85 million profit in 2018.

On April 15, 2020, Wilhelmina received $2 million in federally backed small business loans from Amegy Bank as part of the Paycheck Protection Program. The company received scrutiny over this loan, which was aimed at small businesses.

On March 2, 2023, it was reported that Retail Ecommerce Ventures, a minority shareholder in Wilhelmina, was mulling a possible bankruptcy filing.

See also
 List of modeling agencies

References

External links
 Wilhelmina Models
Wilhelmina Models New York in the Fashion Model Directory

1967 establishments in New York City
Modeling agencies
Companies listed on the Nasdaq